The name Eve has been used to name two tropical cyclones, one in the Atlantic Ocean and one in the Western Pacific Ocean.

In the Atlantic:
 Tropical Storm Eve (1969), churned the ocean between the Mid-Atlantic U.S. states and Bermuda, remained offshore and caused no impacts in either region.

In the Western Pacific:
 Tropical Storm Eve (1999) (Rening)), tracked northwest across the central Philippines and then made landfall southeast of Da Nang, Vietnam

Atlantic hurricane set index articles
Pacific typhoon set index articles